The International Business Council of Florida (also known as IBCF) is a membership-based public not-for-profit organization of businesses and organizations engaged in, or in support of international trade. IBCF was founded in South Florida in 1999; its mission is to facilitate international trade in the state of Florida, to promote and market Florida as a world-class center for global commerce, and to support other organizations that share those goals.

Short history
IBCF has grown rapidly since its foundation as the International Business Council of Ft. Lauderdale in October 1999. Its name was later changed to the International Business Council of South Florida in 2000, and in 2005, its name was finally changed to the current name. The organization has grown from its humble beginnings in 1999 to a long-reaching organization with over 4000 active internationally involved member businesses and organizations.

IBCF events and projects
IBCF hosts and coordinates many seminars, networking, and business training events and projects for both its members and nonmembers, such as their popular international networking events, the (annual) Unity Dinner, the Florida Business Awards, the Ambassador of Commerce Program, the Florida International Summit, the IBCF Business Assistance Program, and the IBCF corporate research program, among several other programs.

On January 31, 2009, IBCF hosted the annual Florida International Business Expo and the Florida International Business Trade Show at the Hilton Miami Airport Hotel and Conference Center, which brought together hundreds of international business leaders from Florida, the Americas, and the world.

IBCF hosts the Florida Business Awards, which is designated the official business awards show of Florida.

Since March 2006, Jay Almeida is the President and CEO of IBCF.

External links 
 

International trade organizations
Trade associations based in the United States
Organizations established in 1999
1999 establishments in Florida